Object-Oriented Software Construction is a book by Bertrand Meyer, widely considered a foundational text of object-oriented programming. The first edition was published in 1988; the second, extensively revised and expanded edition (more than 1300 pages), in 1997. Numerous translations are available including Dutch (first edition only), French (1+2), German (1), Italian (1), Japanese (1+2), Persian (1), Polish (2), Romanian (1), Russian (2), Serbian (2), and Spanish (2). The book has been cited thousands of times in computer science literature.
The book won a Jolt award in 1994.

Unless otherwise indicated, descriptions below apply to the second edition.

Focus
The book, often known as "OOSC", presents object technology as an answer to major issues of software engineering, with a special emphasis on addressing the software quality factors of correctness, robustness, extendibility and reusability. It starts with an examination of the issues of software quality, then introduces   abstract data types as the theoretical basis for object technology and proceeds with the main object-oriented techniques: classes, objects, genericity, inheritance, Design by Contract, concurrency, and persistence. It includes extensive discussions of methodological issues.

Table of contents

Notation
The first edition of the book used Eiffel for the examples and served as a justification of the language design choices for Eiffel. The second edition also uses Eiffel as its notation, but in an effort to separate the notation from the concepts it does not name the language until the Epilogue, on page 1162, where "Eiffel" appears as the last word. A few months after publication of the second edition, a reader posted on Usenet his discovery that the book's 36 chapters alternatively start with the letters "E", "I", "F", "F", "E", "L", a pattern being repeated 6 times. In addition, in the Appendix, titled "Epilogue, In Full Frankness Exposing the Language" (note the initials), the first letters of each paragraph spell out the same pattern.

See also
Uniform access principle

References

External links
Author's Online copy available from September 2022
Book's page at Eiffel Software
Page on Spanish translation
Bertrand Meyer's publication page

1988 non-fiction books
1997 non-fiction books
Object-oriented programming
Software engineering books
Prentice Hall books